Bis(2-ethylhexyl) maleate is the chemical compound with the structural formula , where the two carboxylate groups are mutually cis. It can be described as the double ester of maleic acid with the alcohol 2-ethylhexanol.  It is commonly called dioctyl maleate (DOM), reflecting the older usage of "octane" to refer to any 8-carbon alkane, straight-chained or branched. 

The compound is manufactured by treating 2-ethylhexanol with maleic anhydride and an esterification catalyst. It is a key intermediate raw material in the production of dioctyl sulfosuccinate (DOSS, docusate) salts, used medically as laxatives and stool softeners, and in many other applications as versatile surfactants.

See also 
 Dibutyl maleate
 Diethyl maleate
 Dimethyl maleate

References

External links 
 Aerosol Surfactants
 MSDS
 General data and uses
 product data 

Maleate esters